Hans Schäfer (19 October 1927 – 7 November 2017) was a German footballer who played as an outside left.

Career
Schäfer was born in Zollstock, Cologne. He played for 1. FC Köln between 1948 and 1965, and for the West Germany national team, earning 39 caps and scoring 15 goals. He played in three World Cups, in 1954, 1958, and 1962, earning a winner's medal in 1954 and scoring a total of seven goals from all of West Germany's total 15 matches played in the three editions. Between 1957 and 1962, Schäfer captained Germany 16 times.

Schäfer's position was that of an outside left. In the latter stages of his career, he became an inside left forward. He debuted for Germany on 9 November 1952, in the international friendly against Switzerland, scoring a goal. During the 1954 FIFA World Cup, Schäfer scored four goals.

Schäfer won the German football championship with 1. FC Köln in 1962 and 1964 and was voted German Footballer of the Year in 1963, at the age of 35. He played in the first two seasons of the newly founded Bundesliga 39 matches (20 goals) before retiring from professional football.

Schäfer died on 7 November 2017 at age 90.

References

External links 
 

!colspan="3" style="background:#C1D8FF;"| World Cup-winners status
|-
|  style="width:25%; text-align:center;"| Preceded byAlcides Ghiggia
|  style="width:50%; text-align:center;"| Oldest Living Player 16 July 2015 – 7 November 2017
|  style="width:25; text-align:center;"| Succeeded byMário Zagallo

1927 births
2017 deaths
Footballers from Cologne
German footballers
Germany international footballers
People from the Rhine Province
1. FC Köln players
Bundesliga players
1954 FIFA World Cup players
1958 FIFA World Cup players
1962 FIFA World Cup players
FIFA World Cup-winning players
Association football forwards
West German footballers